Thomas Jamison MacBride (March 25, 1914 – January 6, 2000) was a United States district judge of the United States District Court for the Northern District of California and the United States District Court for the Eastern District of California.

Education and career
He was born in Sacramento, California and attended Sacramento High School. He received an Artium Baccalaureus degree from the University of California, Berkeley in 1936 and a Juris Doctor from the UC Berkeley School of Law in 1940. He was a law clerk for the Office of the Deputy State Attorney General of California from 1940 to 1942. He was in the United States Naval Reserve during World War II, from 1942 to 1946. While in the Navy, he served as a Combat Intelligence Officer with the Seventh Fleet Headquarters of General Douglas MacArthur in Brisbane, Australia. He was in private practice in Sacramento from 1946 to 1961.

California Legislature
MacBridge also served as a State Assembly member for the 8th district from January 7, 1957 - January 2, 1961.

Federal judicial service

MacBride was nominated by President John F. Kennedy on September 14, 1961, to the United States District Court for the Northern District of California, to a new seat authorized by 75 Stat. 80. He was confirmed by the United States Senate on September 21, 1961, and received his commission on September 22, 1961. He was reassigned by operation of law to the United States District Court for the Eastern District of California on September 18, 1966, to a new seat authorized by 80 Stat. 75. He served as Chief Judge from 1967 to 1979. He was a member of the Judicial Conference of the United States from 1975 to 1978. He was a Judge of the United States Foreign Intelligence Surveillance Court from 1979 to 1980. He was a Judge of the Temporary Emergency Court of Appeals from 1982 to 1987. He assumed senior status on March 25, 1979. His service terminated on January 6, 2000, due to his death in Sacramento.

References

Sources

1914 births
2000 deaths
Judges of the United States District Court for the Northern District of California
Judges of the United States District Court for the Eastern District of California
United States district court judges appointed by John F. Kennedy
20th-century American judges
United States Navy officers
UC Berkeley School of Law alumni
Judges of the United States Foreign Intelligence Surveillance Court
Democratic Party members of the California State Assembly
United States Navy personnel of World War II
20th-century American politicians